Hypsopygia impurpuratalis is a species of snout moth in the genus Hypsopygia. It was described by Paul Dognin in 1910. It is found in Guyana.

References

Moths described in 1910
Pyralini